is a multi-use stadium in Onomichi, Hiroshima, Japan. It is currently used mostly for football matches and was used as a venue for the 1992 AFC Asian Cup. The stadium has a capacity of 10,000 people.

External links 
Official site

Athletics (track and field) venues in Japan
Football venues in Japan
AFC Asian Cup stadiums
Sports venues in Hiroshima Prefecture
Onomichi, Hiroshima
Sports venues completed in 1993
1993 establishments in Japan